Tina Sjögren is the CEO and co-founder of Pythom, a Swedish-American aerospace company based in Bishop, California. She is the first woman to complete the Three Poles Challenge - summiting Mount Everest (1999) and skiing unsupported to the South Pole (2001-2002) and North Pole (2002).

Early life 
Tina Sjögren was born in Prague, Czechoslovakia, on 26 May 1959. At age 9, she left the country with her mother and brother as political refugees. She ended up in Sweden, where she met the Swedish competitive sailor and figure skater Tom Sjögren, at the Stockholm School of Economics. The couple married in 1983 and emigrated to New York City in 1996.

Business career 
Together with her husband Tom Sjögren, Tina was a professional explorer and became the first woman to complete the Three Poles Challenge. The couple was awarded a combined four Guinness world records for their expeditions.

As part of their expeditions, the couple invented lightweight satellite communication software and hardware solutions, which later turned into a business with customers including NASA, NGOs, defense units, and extreme explorers. This business was run under their ExplorersWeb.com subsidiary, HumanEdgeTech.

In 2019, Tina and Tom founded Pythom, a California-based aerospace company which is currently in development of a complete human-rated space transportation system, including rockets, landers and spaceships for Earth, Mars, the Moon and asteroids. The space fleet is designed around successful principles from early Earth exploration: low cost, light travel, small and agile teams.

The couple has announced public aspirations of going to Mars on Pythom spacecrafts within the end of this decade, with the first launch window estimated in 2026.

References

Sources 

 Image.

External links 
 Pythom.Space

1959 births
Living people
Czechoslovak emigrants to Sweden
Swedish emigrants to the United States
Female climbers
Explorers of Antarctica
Explorers of the Arctic
Female polar explorers
American technology chief executives